Commission v Germany (2007) C-112/05 is an EU law case, relevant for UK enterprise law, concerning European company law. Following a trend in cases such as Commission v United Kingdom, and Commission v Netherlands, it struck down public oversight, through golden shares of Volkswagen by the German state of Lower Saxony. Soon afterwards, the management practices leading to the Volkswagen emissions scandal began.

Facts
The Commission claimed that the Volkswagen Act 1960 provisions on golden shares violated free movement of capital under the Treaty on the Functioning of the European Union article 63. The VA 1960 §2(1) restricted the number of shareholder voting rights to 20% of the company, and §4(3) allowed a minority of 20% of shareholders to block any decisions. The Lower Saxony government held those shares. Germany argued that the 1960 law was based on a private agreement between workers, trade unions and the state, and so was not within the free movement of capital provisions under TFEU article 63, which did not have horizontal direct effect. Workers and trade unions had relinquished a claim for ownership over the company for assurance of protection against any large shareholder who could gain control over the company.

Judgment
The Grand Chamber of the Court of Justice of the European Union held that the Volkswagen Act 1960 violated TFEU art 63. It was disproportionate for the government's stated aim of protecting workers or minority shareholders, or for industrial policy.

Significance
Soon after the decision, which removed shareholder control from the State of Lower Saxony, the management practices leading to the Volkswagen emissions scandal began. In 2015, it was revealed that Volkswagen management had systematically deceived US, EU and other authorities about the level of toxic emissions from diesel exhaust engines. VW engineers fixed software to switch off emissions reduction filters while VW cars were driving, but switch on when being tested in regulator laboratories. This occurred while the major shareholders, who directly acquired dominance from the decision, were members of the Porsche family with a controlling share and appointing 5 of the supervisory board members, and the petroleum-based economy's Qatar Investment Authority with a 17% stake.

See also

European environmental law
United Kingdom enterprise law

Notes

References

United Kingdom enterprise case law
Court of Justice of the European Union case law